Changbai Waterfall is a 68 m (223 ft) waterfall in China in Changbai Mountain in the Changbai Mountain Range.

Geography 
The Changbai Waterfall is 68m tall. It is the largest waterfall originating from a crater lake. It is most dramatic during the summer snow-melt season from the Lake Tianchi or "Heaven Lake" Tiānchí basin. Tianchi lake is usually frozen over until late June or July. Flow over the waterfall is reduced in winter months but it never completely freezes over since the lake drains from depth below the ice and the water is geothermally heated beneath year-round. The current China–North Korea border passes nearby, through the center of the alpine Lake Tianchi. 

Julong Hot Springs below the falls create pools full of colorful algae that thrive in the geothermal water upwelling. This contributes headwater flow to the young Songhua river. The Songhua flows northward into the Amur, forming China's border with Russia, and eventually into the Sea of Okhotsk facing Sakhalin Island and the northern Pacific.

Culture

Folk religion 
Koreans and Jilin residents traditionally consider the waters of the lake to be sacred. Many Korean-speaking natives bring a bottle to capture some sacred water.

Tourism 
Access to the waterfall is available year-round via a sheltered VIP path up the mountain (visible in photos to the right of the falls). The path is fully enclosed but has windows spaced along the steps. The enclosure protects the path from blockage by snowfall and ice, and is closed during summer.

References

External links 

Landforms of Jilin
Waterfalls of China